Dibang River, also known as Sikang by the Adi and Talo in Idu, is an upstream tributary river of the Brahmaputra in the Indian state of Arunachal Pradesh. It originates and flows through the Mishmi Hills in the (Upper) Dibang Valley and Lower Dibang Valley districts.

Course

The Dibang originates near Keya pass on the Indo-Chinese border in the Upper Dibang Valley district of Arunachal Pradesh. The drainage basin of the river within Arunachal Pradesh covers the districts of Upper Dibang Valley and Lower Dibang Valley. The Mishmi Hills lie in the upper course of the Dibang which enters the plains at Bomjir, Dambuk etc. 

It often changes its course, resulting in flooding and destruction of cultivable land and forests along its banks.

Tributaries 
The Sisar, Mathun, Tangon, Dri, Ithun and Emra are the major tributaries of the Dibang. The Dibang is also joined by a number of tributaries such as the Airi, Ilu, Imu, Ahi, Ashu, Epipani and Eze (Deopani) rivers during its course. Most of these rivers join it in the upper course in the hills thus giving it a wide fan shaped catchment region.

Hydro projects 
As of 2016 there were 18 hydro-electric projects at different stages of proposal and planning in the Dibang basin.

In 2008, Prime Minister Manmohan Singh laid the foundation stone for a 3000 MW dam as part of the Dibang Multipurpose Project the district of Lower Dibang Valley. Seventeen other dams with power potential between 20 and 4500 MW have also been proposed for the Dibang.

On 18 July 2019, the Prime Minister chaired Cabinet Committee on Economic Affairs gave the greenlight to continue with the Dibang hydropower project. The renewal has been backed by the electricity the project has the capacity to generate, help with flood control in the region and as a control measure against Chinese hydro projects.

See also 

 Dibang River Bridge
Dibang Dam

References 

Tributaries of the Brahmaputra River
Rivers of Assam
Rivers of Arunachal Pradesh
Rivers of India